Hamilton's tomb bat (Taphozous hamiltoni) is a species of sac-winged bat in the family Emballonuridae. It is found in Chad, Kenya, Somalia, South Sudan, Tanzania, and Uganda. Its natural habitat is savanna.

References

Mammals described in 1920
Taxonomy articles created by Polbot
Taphozous
Taxa named by Oldfield Thomas
Bats of Africa